Hacienda Citincabchén is located in the Chapab Municipality in the state of Yucatán in southeastern Mexico. It is one of the properties that arose during the nineteenth century henequen boom.

Toponymy
The name (Citincabchén) is a word from the Mayan language meaning "I only like honey". In 1910 the name changed from Citincabchén to Cituncabchén and then in 1921 to Citilcalchén, before changing to Citincabchén in 1930.

How to get there
The puebla, and hacienda are located halfway between Muna and Tekit  approximately 68 km south of Mérida, Yucatán.

History

There was a henequen hacienda at the site which was part of a labor dispute heard in the 1916 Tribunals of the Revolution hearings under Governor Salvador Alvarado.

Demographics
According to the 2005 census conducted by the INEGI, the population of the city was  817 inhabitants of whom were 423 men and 394 were women.

References

Bibliography
 Bracamonte, P and Solís, R., Los espacios de autonomía maya, Ed. UADY, Mérida, 1997.
 Gobierno del Estado de Yucatán, "Los municipios de Yucatán", 1988.
 Kurjack, Edward y Silvia Garza, Atlas arqueológico del Estado de Yucatán, Ed. INAH, 1980.
 Patch, Robert, La formación de las estancias y haciendas en Yucatán durante la colonia, Ed. UADY, 1976.
 Peón Ancona, J. F., "Las antiguas haciendas de Yucatán", en Diario de Yucatán, Mérida, 1971.

Photo gallery

Populated places in Yucatán
Haciendas of Yucatán
Agave production